Located in southern Xuzhou, Yunlong Mountain(), with an elevation of 142 meters, is the second tallest mountain in Xuzhou (Dadong Mountain() coming first). The forest coverage of Yunlong Mountain is 97.9 percent. The dense tree coverage attracts tourists, who enjoy the view of clouds surrounding the peaks all year round. With its nine dragon-like peaks, from southeast to northwest, it is like a giant dragon being overlooked, from which it got its name 'Yunlong'.

Historical attractions

The Giant Scholar Rock (大士岩) 
It is a big rock with many stone inscriptions on or near it. According to the historical record, Su Shi, one of the administration officials of Xuzhou in the Song Dynasty, once climbed Yunlong Mountain but got tired when he passed Huangmao Gang(), so he slept on a big rock. When he woke up, he wrote a poem to express his feeling after waking up in the air. Since then the rock he slept on was called Giant Scholar Rock, or Stone Bed of Dongpo().

The Crane-flying pavilion (放鹤亭) 

Crane–flying pavilion is on the platform at the top of Yunlong Mountain. It was built in the Song Dynasty by Zhang Tianji(). Su Shi often drank with Zhang at the Crane-flying Pavilion. Su wrote “Record of the Crane-flying Pavilion”() to be in memory of the building procedure and the comfort he got when he was in the pavilion.
The Crane-flying Pavilion was rebuilt many times after the original one collapsed, especially in Ming and Qing Dynasty and after the 1911 Revolution.
To the south of the Crane-flying Pavilion, is the Crane-coming Pavilion in front of which is the Crane-drinking Spring.

Xinghua Temple (兴化寺) 

By climbing to the top of the mountain and going down the east slope, you will see Xinghua Temple. What surprises people is that the palace covering the statue is based on only three layers of brick, but the bricks successfully hold the huge palace.

When Xinghua Temple was rebuilt in 1993, 195 Buddhism statues made in Tang and Song Dynasty were found, which greatly contributed to research into Chinese Buddhism. And in 1995, Xinghua Temple was listed in the Provincial Culture Relics Protection Units in Jiangsu.

References 

Mountains of Jiangsu